{{DISPLAYTITLE:C5H5N5O}}
The molecular formula C5H5N5O (molar mass: 151.13 g/mol, exact mass: 151.0494 u) may refer to:

 5-Aza-7-deazaguanine
 Guanine
 Isoguanine, or 2-hydroxyadenine

Molecular formulas